Juan Cruz Argüello (born 19 April 2000) is an Argentinian professional footballer who plays as a right-back for Instituto.

Career
Argüello's youth career started with El Trébol de El Tío, playing for the club for four years from 2006. In 2010, Argüello joined the Instituto youth system. He made his first-team breakthrough in 2019 and was selected for his professional bow during a home defeat in Primera B Nacional to Central Córdoba, coming off the substitutes bench in place of Alan Aguirre on 29 March.

Career statistics
.

References

External links

2000 births
Living people
Sportspeople from Córdoba Province, Argentina
Argentine footballers
Association football defenders
Primera Nacional players
Instituto footballers